Serbian Cultural Association Oplenac is a Canadian organization working for preserving and presenting Serbian cultural heritage through dance and music. Oplenac was founded in 1987 in Mississauga, Ontario. Serbian folk dancing has been a major activity in SCA Oplenac since its founding as a non-profit organization in 1987.

The association states that it is the largest Serbian folklore group in North America. Oplenac representative ensemble has been organizing concerts throughout Canada and the US since 1996, performing in Chicago, Los Angeles, San Diego, San Francisco, Sacramento, Toronto, Mississauga, Windsor, and Kitchener.

References

External links 
 
 Oplenac page at Facebook

Canadian world music groups
Dance groups
Organizations based in Mississauga
Serbian-Canadian culture
Culture of Mississauga